Peter Kirk (1800 – 1 November 1856) was an Irish Conservative Party politician.

He was a member of the Carlton Club.

References

External links
 

1800 births
1856 deaths
Irish Conservative Party MPs
UK MPs 1835–1837
UK MPs 1837–1841
UK MPs 1841–1847